John Vere Hopgood,  (29 August 1921 – 17 May 1943) was a pilot with No. 617 Squadron of the Royal Air Force (RAF). He was killed in action while taking part in Operation Chastise, popularly known as the 'Dam Busters' raid.

Early life
John Hopgood was born on 29 August 1921 in Hurst, Berkshire, to solicitor Harold Hopgood and his second wife Grace. Harold's first wife Beatrice had died in 1918. John was the middle of three children from this second marriage (in addition to a half brother and sister from the first) and was educated at Marlborough College.

Hopgood's younger sister Elizabeth Bell recalled John as a child:

Hopgood was due to go up to the University of Cambridge and study at Corpus Christi College but the outbreak of the Second World War intervened in these plans.

Second World War
Hopgood joined the Royal Air Force Volunteer Reserve in 1940, qualified as a pilot in February 1941 and earned his commission in 1942 when he was promoted to flight lieutenant. October 1942 saw him awarded the Distinguished Flying Cross after completing 47 operations, and a Bar to the award in January 1943. His initial service was with No. 50 Squadron, where he completed his first tour before being posted to a training unit. While in service with No. 106 Squadron, Hopgood participated in the air raid on Gdynia in August 1942 and the daylight raid on Le Creusot in October of the same year. It was during the Le Creusot raid that he made a low level attack on an electrical transformer station from 500 feet.

The new Commanding Officer of No. 106 Squadron, Guy Gibson, arrived in April 1942 and recorded his first thoughts on Hopgood in his book 'Enemy Coast Ahead': 
Of his service with 106 Squadron, Gibson wrote in Hopgood's flight logbook;

Dambusters Raid
Gibson selected Hopgood as his deputy for the attack against the Möhne Dam. While awaiting take off Hopgood spoke with Dave Shannon, telling him that he had had a premonition that he would not survive the mission. Gibson responded to the premonition with, "Hoppy, tonight's the night; tomorrow we will get drunk".

Hopgood took off in the first group alongside Gibson and Mick Martin. It was on the journey to the Möhne that Hopgood's aircraft AJ-M (M Mother) was hit by flak while passing the airfield at Dülmen. Hopgood along with gunners George Gregory and Tony Burcher were injured but they continued the attack. There is a possibility that Gregory was killed by flak at this point.

The damaged aircraft reached the dam where they attacked at 00:32, ten minutes after Gibson. However, they were struck again by anti-aircraft fire and their bomb was released too late. It bounced over the dam and exploded on a power station on the other side. The aircraft was fatally damaged at this point and Hopgood remained at the controls, gaining height to allow his crew to bail out. Rear gunner, Pilot Officer Tony Burcher, remembered hearing Hopgood say; "Get out you damn fool. If only I could get another 300 ft. I can't get any more height". John Fraser, John Minchin and Tony Burcher jumped, but the already injured Minchin did not survive. However, Fraser and Burcher survived and were made prisoners of war. AJ-M crashed in a field near Ostönnen, 6 kilometres (3.72 miles) from the dam. The bodies of Hopgood, Brennan, Navigator Kenneth (Ken) Earnshaw from Bridlington and Gregory were found inside.

Hopgood is buried at the Rheinberg War Cemetery (Coll. grave 17. E. 2-6).

Popular culture
Hopgood was portrayed in the 1955 feature film The Dam Busters by the actor John Fraser.

References

1921 births
1943 deaths
Royal Air Force personnel killed in World War II
British World War II bomber pilots
Recipients of the Distinguished Flying Cross (United Kingdom)
Royal Air Force Volunteer Reserve personnel of World War II
Royal Air Force pilots of World War II
People from Hurst, Berkshire
Aviators killed by being shot down